Sabatia kennedyana is a species of flowering plant in the gentian family known by the common name Plymouth rose gentian. It is native to eastern North America. It has a disjunct distribution, occurring in Nova Scotia, Massachusetts, Rhode Island, Virginia, North Carolina, and South Carolina.

Distribution
Sabatia kennedyana grows in wetlands, particularly lakes and ponds on the Atlantic coastal plain. It grows in areas with fluctuating water levels and other forms of natural disturbance, such as ice scour, which eliminate competing vegetation. It is a poor competitor with other plants.

Description
Sabatia kennedyana is a perennial herb with stolons tipped with basal rosettes of leaves. The flower is pink with a white or yellow center. It may be 5 centimeters wide, with 9 to 11 petals.

Taxonomy
Sabatia kennedyana is considered by some authors as conspecific with Sabatia dodecandra.

Conservation
Sabatia kennedyana is threatened by shoreline development, recreational activity, off-road vehicles, construction of hydroelectric dams, pollution, and poaching.

References

External links
USDA Plants Profile of Sabatia kennedyana (Plymouth rose gentian)

kennedyana
Flora of the Northeastern United States
Flora of the Southeastern United States
Flora of Nova Scotia
Plants described in 1916